Kenneth Ferries (7 May 1936 – 25 July 2014) was an Australian cricketer. He played first-class cricket for Canterbury and Western Australia between 1961 and 1975.

References

External links
 

1936 births
2014 deaths
Australian cricketers
Canterbury cricketers
Western Australia cricketers